Peter Gustav Zwilgmeyer  (6 January 1813 – 14 June 1887) was a Norwegian stipendiary magistrate and politician.

Zwilgmeyer was elected representative to the Storting from Østerrisør for the period 1865–1867. He was the father of children's writer Dikken Zwilgmeyer.

References

1813 births
1887 deaths
Members of the Storting
Norwegian judges